Richard Mayer (born 23 March 1892, date of death unknown) was an Austrian rower. He competed in the men's coxed four event at the 1912 Summer Olympics.

References

1892 births
Year of death missing
Austrian male rowers
Olympic rowers of Austria
Rowers at the 1912 Summer Olympics
People from Litoměřice
Austrian people of German Bohemian descent